Al-Qaeda has conducted operations and recruited members in Africa. It has included a number of bombing attacks in North Africa and supporting parties in civil wars in Eritrea and Somalia. From 1991 to 1996, Osama bin Laden and other al-Qaeda leaders were based in Sudan.

Algeria

An insurgency is being waged by the Salafist Group for Preaching and Combat (which is called today as the al-Qaeda Organization in the Islamic Maghreb) against the Government of Algeria. It is a spin-off to the Algerian Civil War that ended in 2002, and has been linked to bombings in Algiers, Batna and Dellys in 2007.

The group has declared its intention to attack Algerian, French, American and Spanish targets. It has been designated as a Foreign Terrorist Organization by the U.S. Department of State, and similarly classed as a terrorist organization by the European Union.

Eritrea
As soon as the allied Somali and Ethiopian forces drove the Islamic Courts Union (ICU) out of Somalia in January 2007, U.S. accused Eritrea of providing safe haven for some of their leadership. America also condemned Eritrea since it continued to "fund, arm, train and advise the insurgents" attacking the Somalia government. According to a regional Somali government, some Eritrean soldiers were also sighted working with Arab and al-Qaeda fighters against the Somali government, and the foreign alliance attacked government positions.

In 2007 there were reports that the Eritrean government is sheltering the leadership of the insurgency in Somalia. The United Nations continued to report of Eritrean assistance to Somalis with alleged links to al-Qaeda. Accordingly, the UN Security Council said that Eritrea has secretly supplied "huge quantities of arms" to a Somali insurgent group with alleged ties to al Qaeda, in violation of an international arms embargo and despite the deployment of African peacekeepers" adding that it has been "provided to the al-Shabaab (an extremist group which emerged within the ICU’s armed forces and is led by a kinsman and protégé of the ICU council leader Sheikh Hassan Dahir Aweys, Aden Hashi Farah "Eyrow", who trained in Afghanistan with al-Qaeda before returning to Somalia after 9/11) by and through Eritrea" since December 2006. Sheikh Aweys himself and other members of the Islamic Courts Union who are wanted by the U.S. over suspected links to al-Qaeda (the UN has Sheikh Aweys on a list of individuals "belonging to or associated with" al Qaeda, which he denies) organized a congress in Eritrea to strengthen their militant opposition to the Somalia transitional government.

Kenya
In 2002 another successful terrorist attack in Kenya after the U.S. embassy bombing, a car bomb attack on a Mombasa resort hotel popular among Israeli tourists claimed the lives of 15 people. The hotel bombing occurred 20 minutes after a failed attack on an airplane, when a terrorist fired an SA-7 man-portable air-defense system against an Israeli airliner carrying 261 passengers, which was taking off from the airport; the missile seemingly failed to track its target, nor did it detonate, and landed in an empty field.

Libya
On 3 November 2007, al-Zawahiri claimed in a 28-minute recording posted on an Islamic website that "... members of the Libyan Islamic Fighting Group announce that they are joining the al-Qaeda group ..."  According to Al Jazeera, Abu al-Laith appeared to be the leader of the new Libyan wing. Fighting Islamic Group first announced its presence in 1995, vowing to overthrow Muammar Gaddafi, the Libyan leader. In 2001, the group was added to a UN list of individuals and institutions "belonging to, or associated with, al-Qaeda".

Abdelhakim Belhadj, a prominent rebel commander during the 2011 Libyan civil war, in an interview with the Italian newspaper Il Sole 24 Ore admit that many of his recruits had al-Qaeda links. One of the major factions within the Libyan National Liberation Army was the Libyan Islamic Movement. The group, formerly known as the Libyan Islamic Fighting Group, is well known to have had links to Maghreb faction of al-Qaeda.

On 1 November 2011, less than a month after the death of Muammar Gaddafi, the al-Qaeda flag was seen flying off the roof of a courthouse in Benghazi's city center.

The extent of al-Qaeda's involvement is not yet known. Concerns have been voiced about what role MI6 played in collaborating with the Libyan Islamic Movement. The White House Deputy National Security Adviser John Brennan said "I'm concerned about what is going on inside of Libya because there's been a fair amount of disorder and upheaval in the country", "The weapons stock piles - whether we're talking about missile systems or we're talking about automatic weapons - these are things that we and our European allies are working very closely with the TNC [Transitional National Council] and Libyan authorities to get some control over. It's a big country, there were a lot of weapons depots that were scattered throughout the country and we're working again with the TNC and Europeans as well as the regional states. [...] (we are) very concerned about making sure that we do everything possible to prevent al-Qaeda from acquiring these weapons and threatening them.".

Somalia

In February 2012, al-Shabaab officially pledged loyalty to Al-Qaeda. In an audio message to Al-Qaeda leader Ayman al-Zawahiri, the al-Shabaab leader said: "On behalf of the soldiers and the commanders in al-Shabaab, we pledge allegiance to you. So lead us to the path of jihad and martyrdom that was drawn by our imam, the martyr Osama."

Activities of al-Qaeda in Somalia are alleged to have begun as early as 1992. The organization's role during the course of the 1992–1994 UN missions was limited to a handful of trainers. Ali Mohamed and other al-Qaeda members purportedly trained forces loyal to fraction leader Mohammed Farah Aidid. Osama bin Laden himself claimed in an interview with ABC's John Miller to have sent al-Qaeda operatives to Somalia. One of the al-Qaeda fighters present during the interview claimed to have personally slit the throats of three American soldiers in Somalia. Mark Bowden, author of Black Hawk Down, states the terrorist organization did train some of Aidid's men, but they were not personally part of the fight with US forces in the 1993 battle of Mogadishu.

Al-Qaeda was also linked to militant Islamic Courts Union (ICU) front in Somalia. It is believed several terrorist attacks were orchestrated from Ras Kamboni, in the extreme southern tip of Somalia adjacent to Kenya, including the 1998 United States embassy bombings and the 2002 Mombasa hotel bombing. On June 22, 2006, Assistant Secretary of State for African Affairs Jendayi Frazer announced the U.S. was seeking the assistance of the ICU in the apprehension of suspects who carried out attacks against its East African embassies and a hotel in Kenya. She listed the following persons as suspected of being in Somalia (name and nationality): Fazul Abdullah Mohamed (Comoros), Saleh Ali Saleh Nabhan (Kenya), and Abu Taha al-Sudan (Sudan). When the ICU did not cooperate, the U.S. first financed the rival factions, and then followed with limited air strikes as the ICU rule in Mogadishu fell in the face of Ethiopian Army assault. The Pentagon said a high level al-Qaeda member from the ICU was captured in Somalia and transferred to the U.S. military prison in Guantanamo Bay.

After the dissolution of the ICU, Al-Qaeda reportedly established strong ties with the Al-Shabaab splinter group.

In September 2009, it is thought that the Saleh Ali Saleh Nabhan was killed during a military raid in Somalia. He was a top Al-Qaeda suspect and was thought to be responsible for attacks on a hotel in Kenya and on an Israeli airliner in 2002.

Sudan
In 1991, Sudan's National Islamic Front, an Islamist group that had recently gained power, invited al-Qaeda to move operations to Sudan. For several years, al-Qaeda operated several businesses (including import/export, farm, and construction firms) in what might be considered a period of financial consolidation. The group built a major 1200-km (845-mi) highway connecting the capital Khartoum with Port Sudan. However, they also ran a number of camps where they trained operatives in the use of firearms and explosives.

In 1996, Osama bin Laden was asked to leave Sudan after the United States put the regime under extreme pressure to expel him, citing possible connections to the 1994 attempted assassination of Egyptian President Hosni Mubarak while his motorcade was in Addis Ababa, Ethiopia.

Osama bin Laden finally left Sudan in a well-executed operation, arriving at Jalalabad, Afghanistan by air in late 1996 with over 200 of his supporters and their families.

See also
 Al-Qaeda involvement in the Middle East
 Al-Qaeda involvement in Europe

References

Al-Qaeda
1990s in Africa
2000s in Africa
2010s in Africa
Terrorism in Africa